Ingrid Rubio Ruiz (born 2 August 1975 in Barcelona, Spain) is a Spanish actress. She won the Special Mention Award at the 1996 San Sebastián International Film Festival for her performance in the film Taxi.

Career 
She has appeared in over 20 films since 1995 and was named in 1998 as one of European films 'Shooting Stars' by European Film.

She has appeared in a number of successful award-winning Spanish-Argentine co-produced films in the last ten years such as El Faro (1998), The Impatient Alchemist (2002)  and Hermanas (2005). She regularly portrays the role of a sister in her pictures.

She has also worked on TV, for example the mini-series El corazón del océano.

Filmography
1996 Más que amor, frenesí, with Albacete, Menkes Bardem
1996 Más allá del jardín, de Pedro Olea
1996 Taxi, de Carlos Saura
1997 En brazos de la mujer madura, de Manuel Lombardero
1998 Extraños, de Imanol Uribe
1998 El Faro, de Eduardo Mignogna
1999 La otra cara de la luna, de Lluís Josep Comerón
2000 Viaje de ida y vuelta2000 Sé quién eres, de Patricia Ferreira
2000 El viaje de Arián, de Eduard Bosch
2001 Visionarios, de Manuel Gutiérrez Aragón
2001 La soledad era esto, de Sergio Renán
2001 El alquimista impaciente, de Patricia Ferreira
2002 Todas las azafatas van al cielo, de Daniel Burman
2002 La playa de los galgos, de Mario Camus
2003 Noviembre (film), de Achero Mañas
2003 Haz conmigo lo que quieras, de Ramón De España
2006 Salvador (Puig Antich), de Manuel Huerga
2006 Tirante el blanco, de Vicente Aranda
2006 Trastorno2010 Que se mueran los feos''

References

External links
 

1975 births
Living people
Actresses from Barcelona
Spanish film actresses
Argentine film actresses
20th-century Spanish actresses
21st-century Spanish actresses
Spanish television actresses